The 1983 Ball State Cardinals football team was an American football team that represented Ball State University in the Mid-American Conference (MAC) during the 1983 NCAA Division I-A football season. In its sixth season under head coach Dwight Wallace, the team compiled a 6–5 record (4–4 against MAC opponents) and finished in fifth place out of ten teams in the conference. The team played its home games at Ball State Stadium in Muncie, Indiana.

The team's statistical leaders included Neil Britt with 2,377 passing yards, Terry Lymon with 517 rushing yards, David Naumcheff with 1,065 receiving yards, and John Diettrich with 59 points scored.

Schedule

References

Ball State
Ball State Cardinals football seasons
Ball State Cardinals football